Toni Collette is an Australian actress, producer, singer, and songwriter. Known for her work in television and independent films, she has received various accolades throughout her career, including a Golden Globe Award and a Primetime Emmy Award, in addition to nominations for an Academy Award, a Tony Award, and two British Academy Film Awards. After making her film debut in Spotswood (1992) and being nominated for the AACTA Award for Best Actress in a Supporting Role, her breakthrough role came in the comedy-drama Muriel's Wedding (1994), which earned her a Golden Globe Award nomination and won her the AACTA Award for Best Actress in a Leading Role. Collette achieved greater international recognition for her role in the psychological thriller film The Sixth Sense (1999), and was nominated for the Academy Award for Best Supporting Actress.

Collette's films include diverse genres, such as the period comedy Emma (1996), the action thriller Shaft (2000), the period drama The Hours (2002), the romantic drama Japanese Story (2003), the comedies In Her Shoes (2005) and The Way, Way Back (2013), the horror films Krampus (2015) and Hereditary (2018), and the mystery film Knives Out (2019). She received BAFTA Award nominations for her performances in the romantic comedy About a Boy (2002) and the comedy-drama Little Miss Sunshine (2006). Her Broadway performances include the lead role in The Wild Party (2000), which earned her a Tony Award nomination. In television, she starred in the Showtime comedy-drama series United States of Tara (2008–2011) and the Netflix drama miniseries Unbelievable (2019). For the former, she won a Primetime Emmy Award and a Golden Globe Award. She has won five AACTA Awards, from eight nominations. She also starred in the podcast CHRYSALIS.

Film

Television

Stage

References

External links
 
 

Actress filmographies
Australian filmographies